Nelsonville can refer to several places in the United States:

 Nelsonville, Augusta Township, Michigan
 Nelsonville, Charlevoix County, Michigan
 Nelsonville, Missouri
 Nelsonville, New Jersey
 Nelsonville, New York
 Nelsonville, Ohio
 Nelsonville, Wisconsin, a village
 Nelsonville, Eau Claire County, Wisconsin, a ghost town